The Syracuse Orange women represented Syracuse University in CHA women's ice hockey during the 2013-14 NCAA Division I women's ice hockey season. It was the second consecutive season that the Orange won 20 games. Most of their wins came in non-conference contests, thanks to a solid defensive game.

Offseason
August 30: Alumni Holly Carrie-Mattimoe and Lisa Mullan were drafted by the Toronto Furies of the CWHL.

Recruiting

Standings

Roster

2013–14 Orange

Schedule

|-
!colspan=12 style="background:#0a2351; "| Regular Season

|-
!colspan=12 style="background:#0a2351; "| CHA Tournament

Awards and honors

Sophomore Defender Nicole Renault was named to the All-CHA First Team.
Sophomore Forward Melissa Piacentine was named to the All-CHA Second Team.
Forward Jessica Sibley and Defender Larissa Martyniuk were named to the All-Rookie Team.

References

Syracuse
Syracuse Orange women's ice hockey seasons
Syracuse Orange
Syracuse Orange